Shallow Bed is the debut studio album from English folk rock band Dry The River and was released 5 March 2012. The album peaked at number 28 on the UK Albums Chart. The album includes the singles "No Rest", "The Chambers & the Valves" and "New Ceremony".

Singles
 "No Rest" was released as the album's lead single on 17 June 2011.
 "Weights & Measures" was released as the album's second single on 11 November 2011.
 "The Chambers & the Valves" was released as the album's third single on 24 February 2012.
 "New Ceremony" was released as the album's fourth single on 16 April 2012.

Critical reception

Shallow Bed was well received by music critics. Lewis Corner of Digital Spy gave the album a positive review stating, "Frontman Peter Liddle's smooth and dulcet tones - reminiscent of Brandon Flowers - are able to command both the anthemic stadium fillers and the delicate ballads that reside here. The latter is evident on 'Bible Belt', a song dealing with alcoholic parents, where Liddle's vocal nimbly pirouettes over a soft blend of gentle acoustics and orchestral undertones. What's most exciting is Dry The River's ability to open the lid on a song and let it soar; a prime example being the entangled vocal and guitar building throughout 'No Rest', which gloriously explodes by the track's end. This knack has the potential to deliver sky-blistering live performances that should make them a talking point throughout 2012 and, if we're lucky, well beyond."

Track listing

Chart performance

Release history

References

2012 debut albums
Dry the River albums
Transgressive Records albums